Rudi Gering (1917–1998) was a German ski jumper. He was born in Thüringen in Germany and died somewhere in Bavaria.

Career
On 2 March 1941 he set two world records on Ski Flying Study week competition in Planica. On legendary hill called Bloudkova velikanka he jumped 108 and 118 meters.

He was the first German world record holder and first person in history who jumped two times over 100 meters line ever. He helped at the construction of Heini-Klopfer-Skiflugschanze in Oberstdorf together with Heini Klopfer, Sepp Weiler and Toni Brutscher.

Ski jumping world records

Notes

References

External links
"Rudi Gering aus Gehlberg: Ein kaum bekannter Weltrekordler Thüringer Allgemeine (German language)
Homepage zur Chronik des Ortes Gehlberg

1917 births
1990s deaths
German male ski jumpers
Sportspeople from Thuringia